The Super Cup has been launched by the Qatar Volleyball Association between the winners of the League and the Emir Cup of the past season.

References 

Volleyball competitions in Qatar